Kenneth Harlock is a former association football player who represented New Zealand at international level.

Harlock made a solitary official international appearance for New Zealand as a substitute in a 7–0 win over Australia on 11 June 1997.

He attended High School at Waitākere College.

References 

Year of birth missing (living people)
Living people
New Zealand association footballers
New Zealand international footballers
Association footballers not categorized by position